Platybrachys is a genus within the family Eurybrachidae

Taxonomy
Platybrachys contains the following species:

 Platybrachys aegrota
 Platybrachys barbata
 Platybrachys decemmacula
 Platybrachys fenestrata
 Platybrachys lanifera
 Platybrachys leucostigma
 Platybrachys lugubris
 Platybrachys lurida
 Platybrachys maculipennis
 Platybrachys ornata
 Platybrachys sera
 Platybrachys sicca
 Platybrachys signata
 Platybrachys sera
 Platybrachys vidua

References

Eurybrachidae
Insects described in 1859
Taxa named by Carl Stål
Insects of Australia